Menezes, sometimes Meneses, was originally a Portuguese toponymic surname which originated in Montes Torozos, a region in Tierra de Campos, northeast of Valladolid and southeast of Palencia. The ancestor of the Meneses lineage was Tello Pérez de Meneses. The family wealth and power grew remarkably in the 13th and 14th centuries, through several marriages with the Castilian and Portuguese royal families.

As a surname, Menezes/Meneses may refer to:

People
Alex Meneses, United States actress and model
Alexandre Menezes, Brazilian guitarist
Alfred Menezes, Canadian cryptographer
Antonio Martínez de Meneses, Spanish playwright
Antônio Meneses (born 1957), Brazilian cellist
Armando Menezes (1902–1983), Goan poet, writer, academic and civil servant
Artur Menezes (born 1997), Brazilian blues and blues rock guitarist, singer and songwriter
Christianne Meneses Jacobs, United States writer, editor, and teacher
Daiana Menezes (born 1987), Brazilian actress, model and television host
Francisco Meneses Osorio, Spanish painter
Glória Menezes (born 1934), Brazilian actress
Gonzalo de Céspedes y Meneses, Spanish novelist
Guillermo Meneses, Venezuelan writer
Heloísa Pinheiro, Brazilian real-life "Girl from Ipanema"
Holdemar Menezes, Brazilian writer
Icarius De Menezes, Brazilian creative director
Ivan Menezes, Indian-born American/British business executive
Jean Charles de Menezes, Brazilian killed by London police officers who mistook him for a terrorist
João Costa Menezes, Portuguese actor and filmmaker
Jorge de Menezes, Portuguese explorer
Luís de Menezes Bragança (1878–1938), Indian journalist, writer, politician and anti-colonial activist 
Mai Meneses, Spanish singer-songwriter
Manuel Menezes,  Indian business executive, chairman of the Indian Railway Board
Margareth Menezes, Brazilian singer
Monsueto Menezes, Brazilian sambista, singer, composer and drummer
Paulo Barreto Menezes (1925–2016), Brazilian civil engineer and politician
Philadelpho Menezes, Brazilian poet, visual poet, pioneer of new media poetry
Simone Menezes, Brazilian conductor
Tobias Barreto de Meneses (1839–1889), Brazilian critic, poet, jurist
Tyler Menezes, Canadian-American computer programmer and businessperson
Victor Menezes, United States engineer
Vidaluz Meneses (1944–2016), Nicaraguan librarian, poet, dean, and social activist

Politics
António Luís de Meneses, 1st Marquis of Marialva (1596–1675), Portuguese general in the Portuguese Restoration War
António José Severim de Noronha, 1st Duke of Terceira (1792–1860), Portuguese soldier and statesman
Aristide Menezes, political figure in Guinea-Bissau
Carlos Alberto Menezes Direito, Brazilian judge of the Supreme Federal Court
Duarte de Menezes (1488–1539), Portuguese nobleman and colonial officer
Duarte de Menezes, 3rd Count of Viana (1414–1464), Portuguese nobleman and military figure
Fernando de Magalhães e Menezes,  Portuguese colonial administrator and Chief of Staff in 1891
Fradique de Menezes, Former President of São Tomé and Príncipe
Francisco de Meneses Brito, Spanish Governor of Chile
João Afonso Telo, 4th Count of Barcelos (died 1381), Portuguese nobleman
João Rodrigues de Sá e Menezes (16th century), first Count of Penaguião, a Portuguese title
José Manuel da Cunha Faro Menezes Portugal da Gama Carneiro e Sousa (1788–1849), Portuguese count and Prime Minister
Leonor de Castro Mello y Meneses (1512–1546), Portuguese noble and court official, the IVth Duchess of Gandia
Leonor Telles de Meneses, Queen Consort of Portugal
Luís Filipe Menezes, Portuguese politician
Manuel de Menezes, Duke of Vila Real (16th century), Portuguese Governor of Ceuta
Mark Menezes, American lawyer and Under Secretary of Energy
Omar Fayad Meneses, Mexican politician
Pedro de Meneses, 1st Count of Vila Real (1370–1437), Portuguese nobleman and military figure
Dom Roque Tello de Menezes, Portuguese nobleman

Religion
Aleixo de Menezes, Portuguese Archbishop of Braga
Beatrice of Silva Menezes, Saint (1424–1492), Spanish nobleman, foundress of the Order of the Immaculate Conception of Our Lady
Juan Francisco Meneses, Chilean priest and political figure
María Romero Meneses, Nicaraguan nun
Mary Noel Menezes, Guyanese Roman Catholic nun and historian
Rozario Menezes, Roman Catholic Bishop of Lae, Papua New Guinea

Sports
Agdon Menezes, Brazilian football forward
Alex Paulo Menezes Santana, known as Alex Santana, Brazilian footballer
Ademir Marques de Menezes, Brazilian footballer
António de Menezes, Portuguese fencer
Benedicto de Moraes Menezes, Brazilian football player
Bruno Marques Menezes, Brazilian footballer
Bruno Menezes, Brazilian footballer 
Bruno Menezes Soares, also known as Bruno Mineiro, Brazilian football striker
Carlos Menezes, Peruvian boxer
Carlos de Menezes Júnior, Brazilian professional footballer 
Cecília Menezes, Brazilian indoor volleyball player
Christopher Meneses (born 1990), Costa Rican footballer
Eduardo Menezes, Brazilian Olympic show jumping rider
Enilton Menezes de Miranda, Brazilian footballer
Felipe Menezes, Brazilian professional footballer
Fernando Meneses, Chilean footballer
Francisco Jackson Menezes da Costa, known as Jackson Caucaia, Brazilian footballer
Frederika Menezes, Goan author, poet and artist
Gledson da Silva Menezes, Brazilian football defender 
Gustavo Menezes, American racing driver
Harlei de Menezes Silva, Brazilian goalkeeper
Helena de Menezes, Brazilian sprinter
Henry Menezes, Indian football manager
Igor Caetano Menezes Trindade, Brazilian football player
Jady Menezes, Brazilian kickboxer
Jean Meneses, Chilean footballer
Jeferson Lima de Menezes, known as Gauchinho,  Brazilian footballer
João Menezes (born 1996), Brazilian tennis player
Joey Meneses (born 1992), Mexican baseball player
John Meneses (born 1984), Colombian footballer
José Clayton Menezes Ribeiro, Brazilian-Tunisian footballer
Jude Menezes, Indian field hockey goalkeeper
Luís Vinícius de Menezes, Brazilian footballer
Luiz Antonio "Mano" Venker Menezes, Brazilian football manager
Paulo Menezes (footballer) (born 1982), footballer from Brazil
Paulo Menezes (football coach) (born 1978), Portuguese football manager
Luiz Alberto Dias Menezes, Brazilian geologist, mineralogist and mineral dealer
Luiz Henrique Ferreira de Menezes, Brazilian former footballer
Luiz Felipe Costa Meneses, Brazilian football player
Luís Maia de Bittencourt Menezes, Brazilian former footballer
Marcos Antonio Menezes Godoi, Brazilian football player
Osman Menezes Venâncio Júnior, Brazilian footballer
Mauro Menezes, former professional tennis player from Brazil
Paulo Victor de Menezes Melo, also known as Paulinho, Brazilian footballer
Rildo da Costa Menezes, Brazilian footballer
Ronald Menezes, Brazilian freestyle swimmer
Tony Menezes, Canadian-Brazilian footballer
Valeska Menezes, Brazilian volleyball player
Vergel Meneses, Filipino basketball player
Vilson Xavier de Menezes Júnior, Brazilian footballer 
Yasmin Menezes, Brazilian female acrobatic gymnast
William Menezes, Brazilian football goalkeeper

See also
Meneses de Campos, municipality in Spain
MQV (Menezes-Qu-Vanstone), cryptographic protocol

Spanish-language surnames
Portuguese-language surnames